Supporting Roles is a 1989 Cuban drama film directed by Orlando Rojas. The film was selected as the Cuban entry for the Best Foreign Language Film at the 62nd Academy Awards, but was not accepted as a nominee.

Cast
 Rosa Fornes
 Juan Luis Galiardo
 Luisa Perez Nieto
 Ernesto Tapia

See also
 List of submissions to the 62nd Academy Awards for Best Foreign Language Film
 List of Cuban submissions for the Academy Award for Best Foreign Language Film

References

External links
 

1989 films
1989 drama films
Cuban drama films
1980s Spanish-language films